Johann Jakob Trog (21 April 1807 – 7 January 1867) was a Swiss politician and President of the Swiss National Council (1851/1852).

Works

References 
 
 

1807 births
1867 deaths
People from Olten
Swiss Roman Catholics
Members of the National Council (Switzerland)
Presidents of the National Council (Switzerland)